Lanoh may refer to:

 Lanoh people, an ethnic group of Malaysia
 Lanoh language, a language of Malaysia